Luh-ishan, also Luhhiššan, Luh-ishshan, Lu-ishan ( lu-uh-ish-an, also  lu-uh-hi ish-sha-an) was a king of Elam and the 8th king of the Awan Dynasty, around 2300 BCE. He was the son of Hiship-rashini.

Lu-ishan is known from Elamite sources, such as the Awan Dynasty king list, where he is listed as the 8th king of the Awan Dynasty.

Lu-ishan also appears in the inscriptions of Sargon of Akkad, who vanquished him when he conquered Elam and Marhasi. Sargon claims in his inscriptions that he is "Sargon, king of the world, conqueror of Elam and Parahshum", the two major polities to the east of Sumer. He also names various rulers of the east whom he vanquished, such as "Luh-uh-ish-an, son of Hishibrasini, king of Elam", thought to be Lu-sihan, or " Sidga'u, general of Parahshum"(during the reign of 
Abalgamash), who later also appears in an inscription by Rimush.

References

Elamite people
Elamite kings
23rd-century BC rulers
Awan Dynasty